The cabinet of Abdullah Gül took office on 19 November 2002. He succeeded to the fifth government of Bülent Ecevit.

After the Justice and Development Party (AKP) became the biggest party in the general elections of 2002, its leader Recep Tayyip Erdoğan could not be Prime Minister because of a previous conviction and bar from politics. So the second person in the party, Abdullah Gül, formed the 58th government of Turkey. After the legal and political problems for Erdoğan had been eliminated, Abdullah Gül stepped aside and became the Minister of Foreign Affairs of the next government while Erdoğan became Prime Minister.

See also 

 Cabinet of Turkey

Gul
Justice and Development Party (Turkey)
2002 establishments in Turkey
2003 disestablishments in Turkey
Cabinets established in 2002
Cabinets disestablished in 2003